From 1969 to 1991, the Defensive of the Year award was presented by Pro Football Weekly only. PFW and the Pro Football Writers of America combined their awards in 1992. From 2013 to present the awards were presented by PFWA alone.

See also 
All-Pro
Defensive Player of the Year Award (NFC and AFC) (Kansas City Committee of 101 Awards) (since 1969)
Newspaper Enterprise Association NFL Defensive Player of the Year Award (defunct)
UPI AFC and NFC Defensive Player of the Year Award (since 1975) (defunct ?)
NFL Offensive Player of the Year Award
NFL Most Valuable Player awards
Bert Bell Award
UPI AFL-AFC Player of the Year (defunct)
UPI NFC Player of the Year (defunct)

References

National Football League trophies and awards
American football mass media